Ernst Pfeiffer (20 December 1893, Munich – 28 May 1955, Munich) was a German entomologist who specialised in  Lepidoptera
He was a publisher and bookseller. Pfeiffer made numerous collecting trips to Hungary, Dalmatia, Bulgaria, and Persia. He published many scientific papers on Rhopalocera in Mitteilungen der Münchner Entomologischen Gesellschaft and with Osthelder edited  Lepidopteren-Fauna von Marasch in türkisch Nordsyrien in the same journal. His collection of Palearctic and Nearctic butterflies is in the Munich zoological museum Zoologische Staatssammlung München.

References
Daniel, F. & Forster, W.. 1955 [Pfeiffer, E.] Münch. ent. Ges. 44/45 532–536
Dierl, W. & Hausmann, A. 1992 Die Sektion Lepidoptera der Zoologischen Staatssammlung München. Spixiana Suppl. 17 101–107

1893 births
1955 deaths
German entomologists
20th-century German zoologists